Agil Nabiyev (born 16 June 1982) is an Azerbaijani football manager and former player. He is the manager of Shuvalan.

Career
Nabiyev was born in Tovuz.

On 13 January 2013, Nabiyev signed an 18-month contract with FK Baku. In August 2013 Nabiyev signed for Ravan Baku, however in March 2014, after 13 appearances, Nabiyev left Ravan by mutual consent. Nabiyev was made a free agent when Araz-Naxçıvan folded and withdrew from the Azerbaijan Premier League on 17 November 2014.

Career statistics

Club

International

References

1982 births
Living people
People from Tovuz
Association football defenders
Azerbaijani footballers
Azerbaijan international footballers
Ravan Baku FC players
FC Baku players
AZAL PFK players
Araz-Naxçıvan PFK players
Neftçi PFK players